Michał Łoniewski (born 22 October 1988 in Warsaw) is a Polish taekwondo practitioner. At the 2012 Summer Olympics, he competed in the Men's 68 kg competition, but was defeated in the first round.

References

Polish male taekwondo practitioners
Living people
Olympic taekwondo practitioners of Poland
Taekwondo practitioners at the 2012 Summer Olympics
1988 births
Sportspeople from Warsaw